Tour of Duty is an American military drama television series based on events in the Vietnam War, broadcast on CBS. The series ran for three seasons, from September 24, 1987, to April 28, 1990, for a total of 58 one-hour episodes. The show was created by Steve Duncan and L. Travis Clark and produced by Zev Braun.

The show follows an American infantry platoon on a tour of duty during the Vietnam War. It was the first television series to regularly show Americans in combat in South Vietnam and was one of several similarly themed series to be produced in the wake of the acclaimed Oliver Stone film Platoon (1986).

The series won an Emmy Award in 1988 for Outstanding Sound Mixing for a Drama Series, and it was nominated again in 1989 and 1990.

Overview
Tour of Duty examined the issues of politics, faith, teamwork, racism, suicide, fragging, terrorism, civilian deaths, sexuality, drug abuse, and how the lives of soldiers and civilians were permanently affected by the Vietnam War.

The first season began in 1967 and followed Bravo company's second platoon located at Camp Ladybird. Second platoon was standard light infantry platoon conducting "search and destroy" missions in Vietnam, under the command of 2nd Lieutenant (1st Lieutenant from the start of season 2) Myron Goldman (Stephen Caffrey) and Staff Sergeant (later Sergeant First Class) Zeke Anderson (Terence Knox). It was filmed on location in Hawaii at Schofield Barracks.

For the second and third seasons, the series was filmed around Los Angeles, California, to reduce the budget. The same locations, notably a small river with grass on one bank and woods on the other, were reused in a number of episodes. The old set of war comedy-drama television series M*A*S*H was also used for filming.

The change of location also led to a change in the show's direction. Beginning in the second season, the platoon was relocated to a base near Saigon, Camp Arnett. Production staff interviewed in Vietnam Magazine said this change in premise doomed the series because it shifted from being a realistic chronicle about the life of an average combat infantryman to an action/romantic/drama show. CBS wanted female characters because ABC had premiered China Beach, a Vietnam Army nurses drama, which was aimed directly at attracting more female viewers.

In Tour of Dutys third season, the remaining female character was killed off, and the platoon was transferred to a SOG unit under the command of Colonel Brewster (played by Carl Weathers). The unit conducted covert operations in Vietnam and Cambodia which included a fictional version of the raid on Son Tay Prison. The show was canceled at the end of this season due to falling ratings.

Guest stars included Lee Majors, James Hong, Mako, Kelly Hu, Angela Bassett, Ving Rhames, Melora Hardin, Everett McGill, Olivia d'Abo, David Alan Grier,  Richard Brooks, Malcolm-Jamal Warner, William Sadler, and Michael Madsen.

Episodes

Characters

Notes

Music
The opening theme song was an abbreviated version of The Rolling Stones hit "Paint It Black" that had featured in the end titles of the 1987 Vietnam War film Full Metal Jacket; this was removed for the US DVD release. The closing consisted of an instrumental, synthesized tune with a distinctive Asian sound mixed in with acoustic guitar; it was performed by Joseph Conlan, and was never released for public consumption other than in the series. That music was used as background music for most of the series. On the US DVD release, most of the Vietnam War–era popular songs were replaced by instrumental bits to cover the blank spots of music.

All three seasons that have been released in the United Kingdom feature the complete original soundtrack, including "Paint It Black".

The show was known for its classic American rock soundtrack including Creedence Clearwater Revival, Jimi Hendrix, and Jefferson Airplane. One first-season episode, "USO Down", used "live" versions of "Wooly Bully", and "We Gotta Get Out of This Place" as performed by a USO band, the latter song being used also for ironic comment. The songs in this episode were retained in the DVD soundtracks. But for copyright reasons, the VHS and DVD soundtracks of the majority of episodes were replaced with soundalikes, a move which was widely protested by buyers and resulted in a significantly lower sales volume for the third-season DVD set than for the first two.

In the Netherlands, amongst other European nations, a total number of seven albums were released, containing most of the songs featured on the show. As a result, "Paint It Black" was re-released as a single, again hitting the number 1 position in the Dutch top 40 pop charts in May 1990.

The original soundtrack albums
The Tour of Duty television series soundtrack was released by CBS on Columbia Records as four different compilation albums during 1988 and 1989. The original albums are now out of print. Their track listings are as follows:

Charts

 Note: The official Australian chart was the Kent Music Report until June 1988, and which time it changed to ARIA.

Compilation soundtrack CDs
In 1992, Sony Music released a compilation CD titled The Best of 'Tour of Duty'''. It contains only twenty of the songs featured in the four original Tour of Duty Soundtrack albums.

Home media
In 2004-2005, Sony Pictures released all three seasons for the first time in the US, both as individual season sets and a complete series set. Due to licensing issues, all original music was replaced with sound-alike versions, much to the dismay of fans. These releases, which have also been criticized for having substandard sound and picture quality, have since been discontinued.

In 2013, Mill Creek Entertainment acquired the US rights to various television series from the Sony Pictures library including Tour of Duty. In 2014-2015, they re-released all three seasons on DVD, again as individual season sets and a complete series set. These releases have the same poor A/V and replacement music of the Sony issues.

Between 2011-2013, Fabulous Films released identical DVDs in the UK and Australia, both as individual season sets and a complete series set. They have improved audio and video quality over the US issues, and retain the complete original soundtrack, including "Paint It, Black". They also contain extras including cast and crew biographies, hundreds of publicity photos and a feature-length, three-part documentary. The latter includes interviews filmed in Los Angeles in July 2011 with key cast members Terence Knox, Joshua D. Maurer, Steve Akahoshi, Tony Becker, Eric Bruskotter, Kevin Conroy, Miguel A. Núñez Jr. and Dan Gauthier, and key production crew members Zev Braun (producer) Bill L. Norton (writer/director), Steve Smith (writer/producer), Steve Duncan (creator) and Paul Sinor (military advisor).

The complete series was also released on DVD in Germany by Koch Media between 2012-2014, both as individual season sets and complete series sets. These releases replicate the poor quality, music-replacement and extras-free US DVDs but they do reinstate the original version of "Paint It, Black" in the opening credits.

Reception
Television ratings

Awards
The series won an Emmy Award in 1988 for Outstanding Sound Mixing for a Drama Series (for "Under Siege"), and it was nominated again in 1989 and 1990.

Emmy Award nominations:
 1989: Outstanding Sound Mixing for a Drama Series (for "I Wish it Could Rain")
 1990: Outstanding Sound Mixing for a Drama Series (for "And Make Death Proud to Take Us")

Eddie Award nominations
 1988: Best Edited Episode from a Television Series (for the pilot episode)

See also
 China Beach, a similar series set in South Vietnam during the war
 Combat!'', a similar series set in France during World War II that ran for five seasons (152 episodes) from 1962 to 1967

References

External links

 
 Official Tour of Duty UK Fanhub
 HUM90 Tour of Duty fanpage

1987 American television series debuts
1990 American television series endings
CBS original programming
English-language television shows
American military television series
Television series based on actual events
Television series by New World Television
Television series by Sony Pictures Television
Television series set in 1967
Television series set in 1968
Television series set in 1969
Television series about Vietnam War